Kim Soo-hyuk (born May 5, 1984) is a Korean curler from Gyeongi-do. He currently throws fourth stones on Team Kim Chang-min.

Career
At just 17 years old, Kim was a member of the Korean team at the 2001 Pacific Curling Championships, playing third for the team, skipped by Lee Dong-keun. The team finished fourth. They would finish last (10th).

As a junior curler, Kim was the skip of the Korean junior men's team, competing at the World Junior Curling Championships in 2004 and 2005, finishing fourth and eighth respectively. He also led Korea to a gold medal at the inaugural Pacific Junior Curling Championships in 2005. Kim also won a bronze medal at the 2003 Winter Universiade, playing second for Lee.

After juniors, Kim would remain playing with Lee as his third. The team won a silver medal at the 2010 Pacific Curling Championships, qualifying Korea for the 2011 Ford World Men's Curling Championship. There, they finished 11th, with just two wins.

Kim began skipping the Korean men's team in 2013, winning a bronze medal at the renamed 2013 Pacific-Asia Curling Championships. He won another bronze at the 2014 Pacific-Asia Curling Championships, a gold at the 2015 Pacific-Asia Curling Championships and another bronze at the 2016 Pacific-Asia Curling Championships. The gold medal in 2015 qualified South Korea for the 2016 World Men's Curling Championship, where Kim would once again skip the Korean national team. There, Kim would lead his country to just two wins and nine losses, settling for 11th place. 

Kim returned to the Pacific-Asia Championships in 2018, winning a bronze medal. This put the team into the 2019 World Qualification Event for a chance to make it to the 2019 World Men's Curling Championship. They won the event, qualifying them for the Worlds. However, at the World Championship, they struggled, finishing with a 1-11 record in last place.

On the World Curling Tour, Kim has played in one Grand Slam event, the 2014 Syncrude National. Kim's rink won two games at the event, including beating the world champion Niklas Edin rink. Since then he has won five World Curling Tour events, the 2014 Avonair Cash Spiel, the 2015 Uiseong International Curling Tour, the 2015 Avonair Cash Spiel, the 2017 Hokkaido Bank Curling Classic and the 2019 US Open of Curling.

Personal life
Kim is married and has one daughter.

References

External links

Sportspeople from Gangwon Province, South Korea
Living people
1984 births
South Korean male curlers
Asian Games medalists in curling
Curlers at the 2003 Asian Winter Games
Curlers at the 2017 Asian Winter Games
Medalists at the 2003 Asian Winter Games
Medalists at the 2017 Asian Winter Games
Asian Games gold medalists for South Korea
Asian Games bronze medalists for South Korea
Universiade medalists in curling
Pacific-Asian curling champions
People from Uiseong County
Sportspeople from Gyeonggi Province
Universiade bronze medalists for South Korea
Medalists at the 2003 Winter Universiade